Hometown Girls is the fifth solo album by Denny Laine. Unlike the majority of his solo work, the album has a guest contribution, which was provided by Maggie Bell.

Track listing
All tracks composed by Denny Laine, except where indicated.

Side one
 "Cruisin'" 3.51
 "Foggy Morning" 3.29
 "Mistral" (Laine, David Smyth, Mark Eagleton) 7.23
 "Stay Away" 4.03
 "Hometown Girls" 4.11

Side two
 "Red Sky" 3.00
 "I Wish You Could Love" 4.21
 "Twist of Fate" (Laine, Eddie Hardin) 3.41
 "Street" (Laine, Smyth, Eagleton) 5.28
 "Blue Nights" 3.20

Personnel
Denny Laine - Guitar & Vocals
Eddie Hardin
Neal Wilkinson
Joe Hubbard
Lindsay Bridgwater
Earl Lewis - Bass
Mel Collins - Saxophone
Jo Jo Laine - Vocals
Mike Piggot - Violin
Steve Holley - Drums
Lynn Sheppard
Peter Boita - "Drum Doctor" & Electronic Drums on "Street" & various repairs to other backing tracks.
Maggie Bell - Vocals on "Street"

Production notes
Produced by Nick Smith and Denny Laine
Recorded at Herne Place Studios, Sunningdale, Berkshire

References

1985 albums
Denny Laine albums